The Temple class ships were two 68-gun third rates designed for the Royal Navy to the lines of the Vanguard of 1748, i.e. to the outdated 1745 Establishment.
The Temple class ships were the last 68-gun ships to be built - both by commercial contract - to the draught specified by the 1745 Establishment.

Ships

Builder: Hugh Blaydes, Hull
Ordered: 9 September 1756
Laid down: 17 November 1755
Launched: 3 November 1758
Completed: 11 March 1759
Fate: Foundered off Cape Clear, 18 December 1762

Builder: John Barnard & John Turner, Harwich
Ordered: 11 January 1757
Laid down: 9 February 1757
Launched: 24 May 1758
Completed: 3 February 1759 at Harwich, then 15 March 1759 at Portsmouth
Fate:Wrecked in Plymouth Sound, 26 October 1760

References
Lavery, Brian (2003) The Ship of the Line - Volume 1: The development of the battlefleet 1650-1850. Conway Maritime Press. .
Lyon, David (1993) The Sailing Navy List. Conway Maritime Press. 
Winfield, Rif (2007) British Warships in the Age of Sail: 1714 - 1792. Seaforth Publishing. 

 
Ship classes of the Royal Navy
Ship of the line classes